Proposition 17 of 1972 was a measure enacted by California voters to reintroduce the death penalty in that state. The California Supreme Court had ruled on February 17, 1972, that capital punishment was contrary to the state constitution. Proposition 17 amended the Constitution of California in order to overturn that decision. It was submitted to a referendum by means of the initiative process, and approved by voters on November 7 with 67.5% of the vote.

Background

People v. Anderson
The court ruled in People v. Anderson that capital punishment was contrary to Article 1, Section 6 of the state constitution, which forbade "cruel or unusual punishment", and was held to be more strict than the similarly worded provision of the Eighth Amendment of the U.S. Constitution that says "cruel and unusual punishment". Proposition 17 amended the state constitution by adding Article 1, Section 27, which reads:

People v. Frierson
In 1979, it was argued before the California Supreme Court (in People v. Frierson) that Proposition 17 was unconstitutional, as it amounted to a "revision" rather than an "amendment" of the state constitution, and a revision may not be enacted by an initiative. The court rejected this argument. Justice Stanley Mosk filed a concurring opinion in which he reluctantly agreed with the judgment of the court, but also expressed his dismay at the response of the electorate to Anderson:

Aftermath
Despite Proposition 17, no executions were carried out in California until 1992. This was due to the U.S. Supreme Court decision in the same year in Furman v. Georgia (which temporarily halted capital punishment in the United States) and to extensive litigation that occurred thereafter.

See also 

 Capital punishment in California
2012 California Proposition 34
2016 California Proposition 66
2016 California Proposition 62
 People v. Anderson
 Strauss v. Horton
 Twenty-first Amendment of the Constitution of Ireland

References

1972 California ballot propositions
1972
Initiatives in the United States
Capital punishment in California
Criminal penalty ballot measures in the United States